Bonate Sopra is a comune (municipality) in the Province of Bergamo in the Italian region Lombardy, located about  northeast of Milan and about  west of Bergamo.

The municipality of Bonate Sopra contains the frazioni (subdivisions, mainly villages and hamlets) Ghiaie di Bonate Sopra and Cabanetti.

Bonate Sopra borders the following municipalities: Bonate Sotto, Chignolo d'Isola, Curno, Mapello, Ponte San Pietro, Presezzo, Terno d'Isola, Treviolo.

Madonna delle Ghiaie
The region is notable for being the site of controversial Marian apparitions in 1944. 7-year-old Adelaide Roncalli, a resident of Torchio, said she had seen the Holy Family on May 13 of that year and on subsequent days. She also said the Blessed Mother appeared alone and gave her brief messages. The news spread rapidly and huge crowds soon flooded the town from all over Europe. The last reported visitation had a reported 200,000 people in attendance. Although Ms. Roncalli was forced to retract her statements, as an adult she claimed she had been coerced and bullied by the priests and maintained that she actually had seen something. The "Madonna of Ghiaie" is now being investigated by the Roman Catholic Church.

Demographic evolution

References

External links
 www.comune.bonatesopra.bg.it/